Zelyony Bor is a rural locality (a selo) and the administrative center of Zelenoborsky Selsoviet of Mikhaylovsky District, Amur Oblast, Russia. The population was 523 as of 2018. There are 9 streets.

Geography 
Zelyony Bor is located 9 km north of Poyarkovo (the district's administrative centre) by road. Krasny Vostok is the nearest rural locality.

References 

Rural localities in Mikhaylovsky District, Amur Oblast